The Rabindra Parishad is a multi-purpose cultural centre on Beer Chand Patel Path in Patna, India.

Overview
Named after Rabindranath Tagore, it was established in 1948. The building contains a musical school (known as Geet Bhawan), a library with books on and by Tagore, and an auditorium, known as Rabindra Bhavan, which is an important theater in Patna where cultural and theatrical activities takes place. The programme of performances ranges from theatre, to live music, comedy, dance, visual art, spoken word and children's events.

During 2008 to 2010, the theater went a major renovation and suspension. The overall renovation cost was estimated about 1.5 crore. After renovation, the auditorium's seating capacity was increased from 655 to 1,000 and the theater’s structure were improved, too. In February 2011, the state-of-the-art auditorium was inaugurated by the Chief Minister of Bihar, Nitish Kumar.

See also
 Kalidas Rangalaya
 Bhartiya Nritya Kala Mandir
 Premchand Rangshala

References

Theatres in Patna
1948 establishments in India
Arts organisations based in India
Music schools in India
Memorials to Rabindranath Tagore
Convention centres in Patna
Auditoriums in India